Satisfaction is a 2010 Russian drama film directed by Anna Matison.

Plot 
The film tells about the influential businessman Alexander, who after a working day, together with his assistant Dmitry goes to a restaurant in which there are no visitors. They spend time in the company of silent waiters and numerous bottles of alcohol. And suddenly the door is locked from the inside...

Cast 
 Denis Burgazliev as Dima
 Yevgeni Grishkovetz as Sasha
 Oleg Malyshev as Restaurant's owner
 Yuriy Bazilev
 Aleksandr Bratenkov
 Igor Chirva as Civil engineer
 Anna Druzhinina as The seller in jewelry store
 Mihail Meshakin as Waiter
 Aleksey Orlov as Restaurant's worker
 Anastasiya Shinkarenko as Nastya, dishwasher

References

External links 
 

2010 films
2010s Russian-language films
Russian drama films
2010 drama films